The Huszár class was a class of destroyers built for the Austro-Hungarian Navy before the First World War. They were built to a design by the British shipbuilder Yarrow Shipbuilders, who built the first ship, with a further 11 ships being built in Austrian and Hungarian yards between 1905 and 1909. A replacement ship was built when the lead ship was lost in an accident in 1908, and another ship of similar design building for the Chinese navy was seized on the outbreak of the First World War. Two ships were lost during the war, a single ship serving with the Greek Navy following the end of the war, and the remainder being scrapped.

Design
In 1904, Austria-Hungary, keen to upgrade its navy, placed an order with the British torpedo-craft specialist Yarrow for designs for a 400 t destroyer and a 200 t sea-going torpedo boat. Prototypes of both types would be built by Yarrow with production continuing in the Austria-Hungary, split between the Stabilimento Tecnico Triestino (STT) shipyard in Trieste, Austria and the Ganz-Danubius yard at Fiume, Hungary.

Yarrow's destroyer design was a "turtleback" design similar to the Royal Navy's "thirty-knotters", and was based on Yarrow's  built for Japan.

Four funnels were fitted. One innovation compared with the Ikazuchis was that the uptake to the forward funnel was trunked rearward, allowing the funnel to be moved aft, in turn making room for the ship's bridge to be situated well aft of the turtleback forecastle. This made the bridge much drier in high seas.

The original armament consisted of a single  L/45 Skoda gun and seven  L/44 guns, with two  torpedo tubes, one in the well between the turtleback and the bridge, and one aft. The 47mm guns were later replaced by    66 mm L/40 guns.

History
The first ship,  was laid down at Yarrow's London shipyard in September 1904, the ship launching on 31 March 1905 and completing on 19 September 1905, reaching . Orders were placed for a further 11 ships to be built in Austria-Hungary. While STT was quick to begin work, with its first ship,  being laid down in September 1905, work at the Ganz-Danubius yard at Fiume, which had been awarded a contract for six ships in order to split work between Austria and Hungary, was delayed by the need to construct slips to build the ships, its first ship not being laid down until July 1907. Deliveries to the Austro-Hungarian Navy continued from September 1906 to December 1909.

On 3 December 1908, Huszár ran aground near Traste on the Adriatic coast, the ship sinking on 12 December. A replacement ship, with the same name, was built at the Naval Dockyard, Pola, using armament and other equipment salvaged from the sunken ship. The class was rearmed in 1912–1913, with five 66 mm L/30 guns replacing the 47 mm guns.

In 1912, China placed an order with STT for a single destroyer based on the Huszár class, to be called Lung Tuan, with twelve more ships ordered in 1913. Armament was to consist of two 12-pounder (76 mm) and four 3-pounder (47 mm) guns supplied by Armstrong Whitworth, with two torpedo tubes.

Two ships, Streiter and Wildfang were sunk during the war. The Austro-Hungarian Navy was dissolved after the end of the First World War, with its ships being split between the Allied nations. Eight ships were taken over by Italy and two by France in 1920, and were scrapped, while one ship, Ulan, went to Greece, where it served as Smyrni until 1928.

Ships

References

Notes

Citations

Bibliography

 

Destroyers of the Austro-Hungarian Navy
Destroyer classes
World War I destroyers of Austria-Hungary